Daleema (born Daleema John Arattukulam, 30 May 1969) is a South Indian playback singer and a Politician. She is popular for her Christian as well as Hindu devotional songs and made her debut as a playback singer in the Malayalam music industry through her title song "Thechi Malar Kadukalil" composed by Raveendran in the 1997 movie Kalyanappittannu. Her hit Malayalam songs include "Manjumasa Pakshi" from Krishnakudiyil Oru Pranayakalathu and "Ee Thennalum Thingalum" from Nee Varuvolam. On 2015, She was duly elected and sworn in Alappuzha District Panchayat as District Vice President. Currently, she is an M.L.A representing Aroor constituency.

Early life 
Daleema was born on 30 May 1969, as the youngest daughter to John Arattukulam and Ammini John. From a very young age she sang with her brothers and sisters in the village church choir. She decided to pursue singing after her pre-degree and under the guidance of Ramankutty master, she trained in Carnatic music for eight years.

Career 

Daleema began her career by singing on stage shows. Through Kolping Society, she had the chance to sing on international programmes and shows in Germany, Italy and Rome for the Keralites who lived there. She sang in her first Christian devotional album which was composed by Berny Ignatius, and thereafter singing in over 5000 Christian devotional albums. In 1995 she bagged a NANA Award for her song "Venal Poompular Vela" in the album Thapasya by Manorama Music. In the same year she sang for Sariga audios for an album covering S. Janaki's old songs. Through these notable works, she entered the Malayalam film industry by singing in the hit movie Kalyanappittannu directed by K.K Haridas and furthermore singing in almost 20 other movies, a couple of Malayalam serials and around 100 Malayalam professional dramas. She won 3 Kerala Sangeetha Nadaka Academy state awards in the years, 2001, 2003 and 2008, for the best singer, and also bagged 2 Drishya awards. She also dubbed many songs in Kannada and Telugu and sang in almost 2000 stage shows in the country as well as in Europe, America and in the Gulf Countries. In 2015 she was fielded by the Communist Party of India (Marxist) to Local Self Government Institution election in Kerala and elected as the Vice President of Alappuzha District Panchayath Council. In 2021, she was elected to Kerala Legislative Assembly.

Discography 
Following is a partial discography

Personal life 
Daleema is married to George Joseph (Jojo) and they have two children.

Political career 
Daleema entered into electoral politics by contesting Aroor division of Alappuzha District council as a Left Democratic Front candidate in 2015 Kerala local elections. She won the elections and was sworn in as Vice President of the Jilla Panchayath. She again contested local polls from same constituency in 2020 Kerala local elections and won the elections. Daleema defeated the nearest rival candidate Shanimol Usman of the Indian National Congress by a margin of 6842 votes and was elected to 2021 Kerala Legislative Assembly. She is the first playback singer to be elected to the Kerala Legislative Assembly.

References 

1969 births
Living people